Brand Tropical Islands station is a railway station in the municipality of Brand, located in the Dahme-Spreewald district in Brandenburg, Germany.

Notable places nearby
Brand-Briesen Airfield
Tropical Islands Resort

References

Railway stations in Brandenburg
Buildings and structures in Dahme-Spreewald